XHSD-FM is a radio station in Hermosillo, Sonora. Broadcasting on 100.3 FM, XHSD is owned by Uniradio and carries a classic hits format known as Stereo 100.3.

References

Radio stations in Sonora
Mass media in Hermosillo